Emrahia is a genus of moths belonging to the subfamily Olethreutinae of the family Tortricidae.

Species
Emrahia acanthis (Meyrick, 1920)
Emrahia hoplista (Meyrick, 1927)

See also
List of Tortricidae genera

References

External links
tortricidae.com

Tortricidae genera
Olethreutinae